Twelve Crowded Hours is a 1939 film directed by Lew Landers and starring Richard Dix and Lucille Ball.

Plot
When the brother of his girlfriend Paula Sanders is accused of murder, reporter Nick Green tries to clear him.

He suspects gangster George Costain of the crime. Nick steals a satchel of Costain's policy racket receipts, placing his life and Paula's in great danger.

Cast
 Richard Dix as Nick Green
 Lucille Ball as Paula Sanders
 Allan Lane as Dave Sanders
 Donald MacBride as Det. Sgt. Joe Keller
 Cy Kendall as George Costain
 John Arledge as Red
 Emory Parnell as Doorkeeper

References

External links 
 
 

1939 films
1939 drama films
Films directed by Lew Landers
RKO Pictures films
American drama films
American black-and-white films
1930s English-language films
Films with screenplays by Garrett Fort
Films about journalists
1930s American films